Domingo Villanueva (23 December 1964 – 7 April 2020) was a Filipino cyclist. He competed at the 1988 Summer Olympics and the 1992 Summer Olympics.

References

External links
 

1964 births
2020 deaths
Filipino male cyclists
Olympic cyclists of the Philippines
Cyclists at the 1988 Summer Olympics
Cyclists at the 1992 Summer Olympics
Place of birth missing
Cyclists at the 1994 Asian Games
Asian Games competitors for the Philippines